Lauren Weinstein is an American activist concerned with matters involving technology.

He has been quoted as an expert on Internet and other technology issues by various media.

He became involved with those issues in the early 1970s at the first site on the ARPANET, which was located at UCLA. He was the co-founder of People For Internet Responsibility (PFIR) and the co-founder of URIICA — the Union for Representative International Internet Cooperation and Analysis.

Weinstein has been a columnist for Wired News and a commentator on NPR's (National Public Radio) "Morning Edition". He is also a frequent contributor to the "Inside Risks" column of the Communications of the ACM
and an active blogger.

References

External links 
 Vortex home page
 Lauren Weinstein's Blog
 Lauren Weinstein on Twitter
 
 Privacy Digest

Year of birth missing (living people)
Living people
American activists
American columnists
American bloggers
American computer specialists
American radio personalities
21st-century American non-fiction writers